The Croatian Committee was a Croatian revolutionary organization, formed in the Summer of 1919, by émigré groups in Austria and Hungary, in opposition to the creation of the Kingdom of Serbs, Croats and Slovenes (Yugoslavia) and devoted to Croatia's secession from the kingdom. The Croatian Committee and its armed branch the Croatian Legion were dissolved in 1920, some of its members later joined the fascist Ustasha organization.

Creation
The committee was formed in May 1919 in Graz by a group of exiled Croats, most of whom were former members of the Austro-Hungarian Army of Croat descent and members of the Croatian Party of Rights who refused the establishment of the Kingdom of Serbs, Croats and Slovenes and had moved in exile to Austria and Hungary in response. It was started by former Austro-Hungarian officers Emanuel ‘Manko’ Gagliardi, Beno Klobučarić and Vilim Stipetić hoping to fan the flames of anti-Serbian sentiment amongst the Croats discontented with the terms of South Slav unification. Notable members included the former Austro-Hungarian general and administrator of Bosnia and Herzegovina Stjepan Sarkotić.

In 1920 under the sponsoring of Gabrielle D'Annunzio, an agreement was signed between representatives of other anti-Yugoslav emigres to launch combined political and military actions, starting in August 1920, against the Kingdom of Serbs, Croats, and Slovenes to free the nations supposedly persecuted by the Serbs.

Croatian Legion
In November 1919 the Croatian committee organized a Croatian legion. The legion was a volunteer paramilitary force made up of volunteers based in Hungary (in Koszeg, and then later in Zalaegerszeg), thanks to the support of the Hungarian government. The force was established as the nucleus of a future Croatian army. Its chief recruiter was Stjepan Duić, a former Austro-Hungarian lieutenant colonel who found manpower for the legion in Italian POW camps. Although the Committee claimed that the legion was 300,000 strong according to Vladimir Sachs, a member of the Committee it was more in the hundreds. Its commander was Josip Metzger future major general in the Independent State of Croatia who was a former captain of the Austro-Hungarian army. 
The Croat Legion had connection with other Balkan anti Serbia/Yugoslavia paramilitary group, like the IMRO active in Bulgaria, with which they sometimes cooperated.

Dissolution
In 1920 the Belgrade government sent an official complaint to Vienna and Budapest which was enough to end the Croat Committee and the Croat Legion. In 1921, fourteen Party of Rights members (known as Frankists), including former Austro-Hungarian officer Ivo Pilar and historian Milan Šufflay, were arrested in Zagreb for their alleged contacts with the Croatian Committee on charges of treason. The defendants were represented by lawyer Ante Pavelić during the trial that became a cause célèbre and took place over the summer of 1921. Šufflay was sentenced to a three-year prison term.

Legacy
In 1922 former members of the Croatian Legion and the Bulgarian IMRO plotted to assassinate King Alexander of Yugoslavia during his wedding festivities, only to be discouraged by the heavy police presence and massive security precautions after Intelligence agencies heard of the plot. In mid-1928 and early 1929, some of the Croatian Committee's associates later became prominent members of a new émigré group the Croatian fascist Ustasha organization.

Notes

References

Sources
 
 
 
 
 
 
 
 

1919 establishments in Croatia
Political history of Croatia
Organizations established in 1919
Croatian nationalist organizations
Yugoslav Croatia
Croatian diaspora organizations
Political terminology of Croatia
Croatian irredentism